

Men's events

Women's events

Team events

Men's

Women's

Medal table

Events at the 1983 Pan American Games
Shooting competitions in Venezuela
1983